= Shai Mehr Ali =

- Town
- Location within Pakistan
- Coordinates: 33.27°N 73.27°E
- Country: Pakistan
- Province: Islamabad C.T
- Elevation: 558 m (1,831 ft)
- Time zone: UTC+5 (PST)

Shai Mehr Ali is a town in the Islamabad Capital Territory of Pakistan. It is located at 33° 27' 0N 73° 27' 45E with an altitude of 558 metres (1833 feet).
